Vera Neubauer is a Czech born British experimental filmmaker, animator, feminist activist and educator. She is known for her jarring, provocative and anti establishment approach. Her life's work spans genres, from cinematic short film to television series for children. Neubauer has received two BAFTA Cymru awards.

Early life
Vera Neubauer was born to Dr. Helene and Dr. Karl Neubauer in Prague. In December 1965, several years before the Soviet invasion of Czechoslovakia, Neubauer fled the totalitarian regime with her parents and siblings. Arriving in Vienna, Neubauer gained refugee status and traveled on to Düsseldorf. Here she studied Print-making at the State Academy of Fine Arts Stuttgart under professor Gunter Bohmer.

In 1968 Neubauer journeyed to London. She continued to study printmaking at the Royal College of Art and in 1970 switched departments to study film-making. She struggled to survive and squatted in central Brixton. During this period she worked in a local Brixton Youth Centre and taught print-making at Isleworth Polytechnic.

Career
Neubauer's experiences of life as a refugee and the loss of her family, often inform her works. As do her personal takes on the themes of birth, death, abuse, femininity, myth and existence.

In the UK Neubauer became one of founding members of the film collective 'Spectre' that included Stephen Dwoskin, Phil Mulloy, Simon Hartog, Anna Ambrose, Michael Whyte, John Ellis, Keith Griffiths, and Thaddeus O'Sullivan.

Neubauer's collected works are distributed by the BFI, LUX and New York based The Film-Makers' Cooperative.

Neubauer is known for her work in multiple moving image disciplines and for her nuanced feminist stance. She has won multiple awards for her work including two BAFTA Cymru Awards.

Animation

She is a key figure in the History of British animation and is linked to the Second Wave of British Animation (1979–1996). Neubauer has been active as a filmmaker, animator and instigator of social reform for five decades.
Vera Neubauer's films are the terrorist branch of the art form, the Red Brigade of the animated film. (Animating the Unconscious: Desire, Sexuality and Animation by Leslie Felperin)
Her first animated series after graduation was 'Pip and Betssie'  that was commissioned for three years by the Germany television station Bayerischer Rundfunk.
  
Neubauer's oeuvre of animated works is often considered experimental and ‘cutting edge’.
Vera Neubauer is one of Britain’s most innovative and provocative animators. Her highly idiosyncratic style uses an array of techniques, combining animated sequences with documentary and live action drama, provoking and entertaining in equal measure. (British Animation Awards)

She is frequently cited for her ability to combine her personal stories of pain, loss and rebirth, underpinned by a wider societal commentary. Her canon of work mixes various techniques such as 2D drawing with photography, scratching into film emulation, cut out collage and giving character to found objects.

Live action
Neubauer's works often center around, and are created within her own neighborhood. Many of her films are short and meditative. Neubauer often uses the camera, much as a painter would use a brush, to create broad poetic strokes.

Neubauer's first drama film “Don’t be Afraid” made in 1990 starred a young Nick Moran in the lead. It was based on the life of a squatting white couple who gave birth to a mixed race baby. The film gave an insight into issues facing young urban youth, both political and personal, whilst confronting audience's expectations and prejudices.

Her narrative and experimental films make use of guerrilla production techniques and are often socially critical and focus on social issues, poverty, women's rights, abuse and the homelessness.

Education
Neubauer taught for nearly 30 years at Royal College of Art, Central Saint Martins and Goldsmiths College.

In literature / film
Neubauer is the subject of Maria Anna Tappeiner's 2012 45 minute documentary for 3sat 'Das Ganze Leben im Trickfilm' ('An Entire Life in Animation').

Retrospectives
The International Festival of Animation Bristol  1987  
Unity Theatre, Liverpool  1987 
Fantoche Film Festival Switzerland   1997 
Animania Mostra Internationale Del Nuovo Cinema Roma  1998 
Metro Cinema (Derby) 2000 
Lleida International Animation Film Festival (now known as Animac) 2002  
Mecal International Short Film Festival Barcelona    2002 
Tampere Film Festival 2003 
Anima Mundi (event)    2003 
Mumbai International Film Festival 2004 
Interfilm Berlin   2005 
Volda University College Norway   2006 
International Animated Film Festival Sienna 2009 
Mediawave, Hungary  2010 
China Academy of Art – Hangzhou, China  2012 
Anifilm - Třeboň 2015 
Epos Art Film Festival TelAviv   2018 
Fantoche Baden    2018 
Cinanima Espino Portugal  2018 
Animator Poznan Poland 2018

Filmography

External links
Vera Neubauer at the British Film Institute
Vera Neubauer at The Film-Makers' Cooperative

References

Living people
Year of birth missing (living people)
Alumni of the Royal College of Art
British experimental filmmakers
British animators
Feminist filmmakers
Czech animators
Czech women animators
British animated film directors
British women film directors
English animators
British women animators
Stop motion animators